Winfield Charles Noyes (June 16, 1889 – April 8, 1969) was an American professional baseball pitcher. He played in Major League Baseball (MLB) for the Boston Braves, Philadelphia Athletics, and Chicago White Sox.

Minor league career
Noyes was born in Pleasanton, Nebraska and attended Nebraska Wesleyan University. He started his professional baseball career in 1910 in the Nebraska State League and went 24-12, leading the league in wins and strikeouts. He had another big season in 1912, going 26-8 for the Spokane Indians in the class B Northwestern League. He was purchased by the Boston Braves in July and pitched sparingly for them in 1913.

Noyes returned to Spokane for the 1914 and 1915 seasons. He won 23 and 22 games in those years. In 1916, he pitched in the Pacific Coast League and won 21 times.

Major league career
Noyes broke into the Athletics starting rotation in 1917. He went 10-10 with a 2.95 earned run average and was one of the best pitchers on the team. However, he sat out the entire 1918 season due to military service. He pitched badly upon his return in 1919 and retired after the season ended.

References

External links

1889 births
1969 deaths
Major League Baseball pitchers
Boston Braves players
Philadelphia Athletics players
Chicago White Sox players
Baseball players from Nebraska
People from Buffalo County, Nebraska
Nebraska Wesleyan Prairie Wolves baseball players
Kearney Kapitalists players
Ottumwa Speedboys players
San Francisco Seals (baseball) players
Spokane Indians players
Portland Beavers players